Belvedere is a locality in Alberta, Canada.

The community was named from the Italian belvedere, due to the site's lofty elevation.

References 

Localities in the County of Barrhead No. 11